The Dark Wave is a 1956 American short documentary film directed by Jean Negulesco about a young girl with severe epilepsy. The short stars Charles Bickford and features Nancy Davis, the actress who would later become First Lady of the United States Nancy Reagan. It was made in cooperation with the Variety Club Foundation to Combat Epilepsy (a predecessor of the Epilepsy Foundation), who received the profits.

The Dark Wave was nominated for two Academy Awards, one for Best Documentary Short and the other for Best Two-Reel Short.

Cast
 Charles Bickford
 Nancy Davis
 Cornell Borchers

See also
List of American films of 1956

References

External links

1956 films
1956 short films
1950s short documentary films
American short documentary films
20th Century Fox short films
Films directed by Jean Negulesco
1956 documentary films
Documentary films about children with disability
Epilepsy
1950s English-language films
1950s American films